Jaume Raventós i Pijoan (1905-1982) was a Catalan scientist and pharmacologist.

As a refugee from Franco's Spain he worked in Edinburgh and Manchester.  Intimately involved in the characterisation of Halothane (or Fluothane) in conjunction with Charles Suckling. Known as James Raventos in the UK. In the period 1928-1933 he worked in Barcelona with August Pi i Sunyer and Francesc Domènech i Alsina.

1905 births
1982 deaths
Scientists from Catalonia
Spanish pharmacologists